The KOVO Cup is a professional volleyball competition in Korea hosted by the Korea Volleyball Federation (KOVO). This competition is played in a format of round-robin matches followed by a knock-out stage as the CEV Champions League. It is held from July to September before the V-League. The competition is held in a centralized venue each year.

Finals

Men

Women 
{| class="wikitable"
!Season
!style="background:gold;"|Champions
!Score
!style="background:silver;"|Runners-up
!Venue
!Ref
|- align="center"
|2006
|Hyundai E&C
|3–23–0
|Korea Expressway
|Yangsan Gymnasium
|
|- align="center"
|2007
|GS Caltex
|3–0
|KT&G
|Masan Gymnasium
|
|- align="center"
|2008
|KT&G
|3–0
|Korea Expressway
|Yangsan Gymnasium
|
|- align="center"
|2009
|Tianjin Bohai
|3–2
|Hyundai E&C
|Busan Sajik Arena
|
|- align="center"
|2010
|Heungkuk Life
|3–0
|Korea Expressway
|Suwon Gymnasium
|
|- align="center"
|2011
|Korea Expressway
|3–2
|KGC
|Suwon Gymnasium
|
|- align="center"
|2012
|GS Caltex|3–1
|IBK
|Suwon Gymnasium
|
|- align="center"
|2013
|IBK|3–0
|Hyundai E&C
| Ansan Sangnoksu Arena
|
|- align="center"
|2014
|Hyundai E&C|3–1
|GS Caltex
|Ansan Sangnoksu Arena
|
|- align="center"
|2015
|IBK|3–2
|Hyundai E&C
|Cheongju Gymnasium
|
|- align="center"
|2016
|IBK|3–0
|KGC
|Cheongju Gymnasium
|
|- align="center"
|2017
|GS Caltex|3–1
|Korea Expressway
|Yu Gwansun Gymnasium
|
|- align="center"
|2018
|KGC|3–2
|GS Caltex
| Boryeong Gymnasium
|
|- align="center"
|2019
|Hyundai E&C|3–2
|KGC
|Suncheon Palma Gymnasium
|
|- align="center"
|2020
|GS Caltex|3–0
|Heungkuk Life
|Jecheon Gymnasium
|
|- align="center"
|2021
|Hyundai E&C|3–0
|GS Caltex
|Uijeongbu Gymnasium
|
|- align="center"
|2022
|GS Caltex'|3–0
|Korea Expressway
|Suncheon Palma Gymnasium
|
|}

 Championships by teams 

 Men ~2022 Women ~2022''

References

External links 
 KOVO

Volleyball competitions in South Korea
2006 establishments in South Korea
Sports leagues established in 2006